Luni Junction railway station is a small railway station in Jodhpur district, Rajasthan. Its code is LUNI. It serves Luni city. The station consists of two platforms. The platforms are not well sheltered.

Major trains 

 Bhagat Ki Kothi–Pune Express
 Hisar–Coimbatore AC Superfast Express
 Bandra Terminus–Jaisalmer Superfast Express
 Bandra Terminus–Hisar Superfast Express
 Suryanagri Express
 Ranakpur Express
 Bikaner–Dadar Superfast Express
 Gandhidham–Jodhpur Express

References

Railway stations in Jodhpur district
Jodhpur railway division